The first election to Mid Glamorgan County Council and was held in April 1973. It was followed by the 1977 election.

The new authority came into effect from 1 April 1974 following the division of the former Glamorgan County Council into three new authorities.

Candidates
The Labour Party fielded candidates in every ward. A significant proportion of seats were contested by the Conservative Party and Plaid Cymru with fewer candidates fielded by the Liberal Party.

Numerous members of the former Glamorgan County Council stood for election, notably for Labour. These included Alfred Bowen (Bridgend) and Bertie Rowland (Caerphilly).

Fred Riddiford, former Labour councillor for Aberaman on the former Glamorgan authority, contested the seat for Plaid Cymru.

Ward Results

Aberdare No.1: Llwydcoed (two seats)

Aberdare No.2: Blaengwawr (one seat)

Aberdare No.3: Gadlys (one seat)

Aberdare No.4: Town (one seat)

Aberdare No.5: Aberaman (one seat)

Abertridwr and Senghennydd

Bedwas and Machen (two seats)

Bedwellty No.1 (one seat)

Bedwellty No.2  (one seat)

Bridgend (two seats)

Caerphilly No.1 (one seat)

Caerphilly No.2 Llanbradach (one seat)

Caerphilly No.4 (one seat)

Caerphilly No.5 North (one seat)

Caerphilly No.6 South (one seat)

Caerphilly No.7 (one seat)

Cardiff Rural (one seat)

Cowbridge Rural (one seat)

Dowlais (one seat)

Gelligaer No.1 (one seat)

Gelligaer No.2 (one seat)

Gelligaer No.3 (one seat)

Gelligaer No.4 (two seats)

Llantrisant and Llantwitfardre No.1 (four seats)

Llantrisant and Llantwitfardre No.2 (four seats)

Maesteg No.1 (one seat)

Maesteg No.2 (one seat)

Maesteg No.3 (one seat)

Merthyr, Cyfarthfa (one seat)

Merthyr No.6 (one seat)

Merthyr No.7 (one seat)

Merthyr Park (two seats)

Merthyr Town (one seat)

Mountain Ash No.1 (one seat)

Mountain Ash No.2 (one seat)

Mountain Ash No.3 (two seats)

Ogmore and Garw No.1 (one seat)

Ogmore and Garw No.2 (two seats)

Penybont No.1 (one seat)

Penybont No.2 (two seats)

Penybont No.3 (one seat)

Penybont No.4 (one seat)

Penybont No.5 (two seats)

Penybont No.6 (two seats)

Penydarren(one seat)

Pontypridd No.1 (one seat)

Pontypridd No.2 Town (one seat)

Pontypridd No.3 (one seat)

Pontypridd No.4 Trallwn (one seat)

Pontypridd No.5 Rhydyfelin (two seats)

Pontypridd No.6 (one seat)

Porthcawl No.1 (one seat)

Porthcawl No.2 (one seat)

Rhondda No.1 Treherbert (two seats)

Rhondda No.2 Treorchy (two seats)

Rhondda No.3 Pentre (one seat)

Rhondda No.4 Ystrad (one seat)

Rhondda No.5 (one seat)

Rhondda No.6 (one seat)

Rhondda No.7 Penygraig (one seat)

Rhondda No.8 Porth (two seats)

Rhondda No.9 (one seat)

Rhymney Lower, Middle and Upper (one seat)

Treharris (one seat)

Vaynor and Penderyn No.1 (one seat)

Vaynor and Penderyn No.2 (one seat)

References

Mid Glamorgan
1973